Lin Han (born 24 January 1985) is a Taiwanese baseball player who plays for the Taiwan Cooperative Bank baseball team. He is a cousin of former Taiwan national team pitcher Cheng-Hsun Hsieh.

Lin played for Taiwan in the 2001 World Youth Baseball Championship and 2006 World University Baseball Championship. In the 2006 Haarlem Baseball Week, he went 1 for 11 in his first action with a senior Taiwan national team. During the 2007 World Port Tournament, he hit .206/.289/.235 and made four errors in nine games.

Lin was drafted by the Chinatrust Whales in 2007. When the Whales were disbanded following a 2008 gambling scandal, he went to the Uni-President Lions in the 2nd round of the disbursement draft. As he was completing his military service, he had not played yet for the Whales.

Lin was on Taiwan's roster for the 2009 World Baseball Classic. He played in their loss to China, pinch-hitting for Yen-Wen Kuo and drawing a Guoqiang Sun walk in the 7th. In the 9th, he grounded out against Chen Kun.

Lin hit .226/.294/.226 in the 2009 World Port Tournament and fielded only .870 at third base.

He also played for Taiwan in the 2013 World Baseball Classic.

Lin participated in the 2014 Asian Games, where Chinese Taipei won a silver medal, losing in the final to South Korea.

References

External links
Taiwan Baseball Blog
2007 World Port Tournament
Honkbalweek website
CBS Sports
2009 World Port Tournament

1985 births
Living people
2009 World Baseball Classic players
2013 World Baseball Classic players
Baseball players from Taipei
Asian Games medalists in baseball
Baseball players at the 2014 Asian Games
Baseball players at the 2018 Asian Games
Asian Games silver medalists for Chinese Taipei
Asian Games bronze medalists for Chinese Taipei
Place of birth missing (living people)
Medalists at the 2014 Asian Games
Medalists at the 2018 Asian Games